The Lohner L was a reconnaissance flying boat produced in Austria-Hungary during World War I. It was a two-bay biplane of typical configuration for the flying boats of the day, with its pusher engine mounted on struts in the interplane gap. The pilot and observer sat side by side in an open cockpit, and both the upper and lower sets of wings featured sweepback.

Development
The design was essentially a more powerful version of the Lohner E, and became highly influential. Apart from licensed production by UFAG, the L provided the basis for designs by other major manufacturers. In turn, the L.1 would provide the foundation for a large number of Macchi designs over the coming years.

The captured aircraft (serial L.40) was taken intact near the naval air station of Porto Corsini. The captured flying boat was copied by Macchi-Nieuport and the L.1 was built within a month. The L.1s were delivered to Italian maritime reconnaissance and bombing units based on the Adriatic. An improved version was developed as the Macchi L.2

A restored example of an Austro-Hungarian Lohner L (serial L.127) is preserved at the Italian Air Force Museum at Vigna di Valle.

Operational history
Lohner seaplanes saw extensive use before and during World War I, and those aircraft that survived the war served for several years. Some important and interesting events are related, such as:
Immediately after the declaration of war by Austria-Hungary on Serbia and Montenegro, from 28 July 1914 to 2 August 1914, Lohner L seaplanes from Kumbor patrolled and photographed the Montenegrin artillery positions, representing the first use of aircraft in World War I.
On 16 September 1915 Lohner L 132 piloted by a Lieutenant Commander Dimitrije Konjović and Lohner L 135 piloted by Walter Železni, on regular reconnaissance missions off Cattaro found the French Brumaire-class submarine Foucault and attacked it with bombs. The submarine was  damaged in the attack and was abandoned by her crew. One Lohner flying boat landed at sea, captured two French officers and transported them to Kumbor. The other members of the crew were rescued by an Austro-Hungarian torpedo boat. This was the first sinking of a submarine from the air in the history of aviation.

Variants
 Lohner L
 Lohner R - Photo-reconnaissance version
 Lohner S - Trainer version
 Macchi L.1 - with Fiat machine gun and Isotta-Fraschini V.4a engine (14 built)

Operators

Austro-Hungarian Navy

Kaiserliche Marine

Regia Marina (Macchi L.1)

Yugoslav Royal Navy - 4 aircraft Lohner TL

Specifications (Lohner L)

See also

Notes

References

Further reading

1910s Austro-Hungarian military reconnaissance aircraft
L
Lohner L
L.01
Flying boats
Military aircraft of World War I
Biplanes
Single-engined pusher aircraft
Aircraft first flown in 1915